This is a list of butterflies of Russia. About 540 species are known from Russia. The butterflies (mostly diurnal) and moths (mostly nocturnal) together make up the taxonomic order Lepidoptera.

The history of lepidopterology in Russia is connected with the organization of the first Russian museum The Kunstkamera established by Peter the Great  in 1714. In 1717, he purchased the collection of Albert Seba, a merchant from Amsterdam, for the new museum. In 1832 the Zoological Museum of the Imperial Academy of Sciences was separated as a distinct institution which in 1931 became the Zoological Institute of the USSR Academy of Sciences  (since 1991 — Russian Academy of Sciences).

In 1859, the then director of the Zoological Museum, Johann Friedrich von Brandt was one of the founders of the Russian Entomological Society in 1859 and in St. Petersburg . Other founders were Karl Ernst von Baer, Ya. A. Kushakevich, Colonel Alexander Karlovich Manderstern, Alexander von Middendorff and Colonel of General Staff Victor Ivanovitsch Motschulsky. Another society founder was Ferdinand Morawitz. Eduard Brandt and Ferdinand Morawitz. Also important was the Moscow Society of Naturalists and increasingly the Russian Academy of Sciences and The Academy of Sciences of the USSR. From the mid-nineteenth century the main zoogeographic focus was on the Caucasus, Siberia and the Russian Far East. At the end of the nineteenth century the German entomologist Otto Staudinger financed collectors in the Far East of Russia. In the early twentieth century the results of all these endeavours were summarised in Die Gross-Schmetterlinge der Erde edited by Adalbert Seitz.

From 1925 lepidopterology was organised by The Academy of Sciences of the USSR and lists titled USSR or SSR. In 1991 The Academy of Sciences of the USSR became once again the Russian Academy of Sciences.

Notable Russian lepidopterists include Peter Simon Pallas, Johann Friedrich von Eschscholtz, Édouard Ménétries, Johann von Böber, Hugo Theodor Christoph, Alexander Yakhontov, Alexander von Nordmann, Vasily Evgrafovich Yakovlev, Victor Motschulsky, Sergei Alphéraky, Otto Vasilievich Bremer, Grigory Grum-Grshimailo, Alexei Pavlovich Fedchenko, Nicholas Mikhailovich, Nikolay Grigoryevich Erschoff, Nikolai Yakovlevich Kuznetsov, Grigory Bey-Bienko and Yuri Korshunov.

Butterflies of Russia

Hesperiidae
genus: Aeromachus
Aeromachus inachus (Menetries, 1859)
genus: Bibasis
Bibasis aquilina (Speyer, 1879)
genus: Carcharodus
Carcharodus alceae (Esper, [1780])
Carcharodus flocciferus (Zeller, 1847)
Carcharodus lavatherae (Esper, [1783])
Carcharodus orientalis Reverdin, 1913
genus: Carterocephalus
Carterocephalus argyrostigma (Eversmann, 1851) South Siberia
Carterocephalus dieckmanni Graeser, 1888 Amur Oblast
Carterocephalus palaemon (Pallas, 1771)
Carterocephalus silvicola (Meigen, 1829)
genus: Daimio
Daimio tethys (Menetries, 1857)
genus: Erynnis
Erynnis montanus (Bremer, 1861) Amur Oblast
Erynnis popoviana (Nordmann, 1851) Zabaykalsky, Amur Oblast
Erynnis tages (Linnaeus, 1758)
genus: Hesperia
Hesperia comma (Linnaeus, 1758)
Hesperia florinda (Butler, 1878) Pribaikalye (Siberia), Zabaykalsky
genus: Heteropterus
Heteropterus morpheus (Pallas, 1771)
genus: Leptalina
Leptalina unicolor (Bremer & Grey, 1853)
genus: Lobocla
Lobocla bifasciatus (Bremer & Grey, 1853) Amur Oblast, Ussuri
genus: Muschampia
Muschampia cribrellum (Eversmann, 1841)
Muschampia gigas (Bremer, 1864) Amur Oblast
Muschampia protheon (Rambur, 1858) Transbaikal
Muschampia proto (Ochsenheimer, 1808)
Muschampia tessellum (Hübner, [1803])
genus: Ochlodes
Ochlodes ochracea (Bremer, 1861) Amur Oblast
Ochlodes subhyalina (Bremer & Grey, 1853) Amur Oblast
Ochlodes sylvanus (Esper, 1777)
Ochlodes venatus (Bremer & Grey, 1853) Amur Oblast, Sakhalin
genus: Parnara
Parnara guttatus (Bremer & Grey, 1853)
genus: Polytremis 
Polytremis pellucida (Murray, 1875)
Polytremis zina (Evans, 1932) Amur Oblast, Sakhalin
genus: Potanthus
Potanthus flava (Murray, 1875)
genus: Pyrgus
Pyrgus alveus (Нubnеr, [1803])
Pyrgus andromedae (Wallengren, 1853)
Pyrgus armoricanus Oberthur, 1910)
Pyrgus carthami Hübner, [1813])
Pyrgus centaureae (Rambur, [1839])
Pyrgus cinarae (Rambur, [1839])
Pyrgus jupei (Alberti, 1967)
Pyrgus maculatus (Bremer & Grey, 1853) Mountains of South Siberia, Sayan Mountains, Zabaykalsky, Priamurye, Primorye
Pyrgus malvae (Linnaeus, 1758)
Pyrgus melotis (Duponchel, [1834])
Pyrgus serratulae (Rambur, [1839])
Pyrgus sibirica (Reverdin, 1911) Altai Mountains, Sayan Mountains
Pyrgus sidae (Esper,[1784])
Pyrgus speyeri (Staudinger, 1887) Sayan Mountains, Pribaikalye, Zabaykalsky, Priamurye, Primorye
genus: Satarupa
Satarupa nymphalis (Speyer, 1879) Primorsky (Amur)
genus: Spialia
Spialia orbifer Hübner, [1823])
genus: Thoressa 
Thoressa varia (Murray, 1875)
genus: Thymelicus
Thymelicus acteon (Rottemburg, 1775)
Thymelicus hyrax (Lederer, 1861) European Russia South
Thymelicus leonina (Butler, 1878)
Thymelicus lineola (Ochsenheimer, 1808)
Thymelicus sylvatica (Bremer, 1861) Amur, Ussuri
Thymelicus sylvestris (Poda, 1761)

Lycaenidae
genus: Agriades
Agriades glandon (Prunner, 1798)
Agriades optilete (Knoch, 1781)
Agriades pheretiades (Eversmann, 1843)
Agriades pyrenaicus (Boisduval, 1840)
genus: Ahlbergia
Ahlbergia aleucopuncta Johnson, 1992
Ahlbergia ferrea (Butler, 1866) Zabaykalsky Krai
Ahlbergia frivaldszkyi (Lederer, 1853) Transbaikalia, Russian Far East, Kamchatka, Amur Oblast, Ussuri
Ahlbergia korea Johnson, 1992 Amur Oblast, Ussuri
genus: Antigius
Antigius attilia (Bremer, 1861)
Antigius butleri (Fenton, [1882]) Amur Oblast, Primorye, Ussuri
genus: Araragi
Araragi enthea (Janson, 1877) Amur Oblast, Ussuri
genus: Aricia
Aricia agestis ([Denis & Schiffermüller], 1775)
Aricia anteros (Freyer, 1838) South European Russia
Aricia artaxerxes (Fabricius, 1793)
Aricia chinensis (Murray, 1874) Amur Oblast, Ussuri, South Siberia, Turkestan, Altai Mountains, Greater Caucasus
Aricia nicias (Meigen, 1830)
Aricia teberdina (Sheljuzhko, 1934) Greater Caucasus
genus: Artopoetes
Artopoetes pryeri (Murray, 1873) South Amur, Ussuri
genus: Atara
Atara arata (Bremer, 1861) Amur Oblast, Sakhalin
Atara саеrulеа (Bremer & Grey, 1853) Amur Oblast
genus: Athamanthia
Athamanthia japhetica (Nekrutenko & Effendi, 1983) Caucasus Minor
genus: Callophrys 
Callophrys butlerovi Migranov, 1991 South Urals
Callophrys chalybeitincta Sovinsky, 1905 Caucasus Minor
Callophrys rubi (Linnaeus, 1758)
genus: Celastrina
Celastrina argiolus (Linnaeus, 1758)
Celastrina fedoseevi Korshunov & Ivonin, 1990 Transbaikalia, Amur Oblast
Celastrina filipjevi (Riley, 1934) Ussuri
Celastrina ladonides (de l'Orza, 1867)
Celastrina oreas (Leech, 1893) Amur Oblast, Ussuri
Celastrina phellodendroni Omelko, 1987 Ussuri
Celastrina sugitanii (Matsumura, 1919) Sakhalin
genus: Coreana
Coreana raphaelis (Oberthur, 1880)
genus: Cupido
Cupido alcetas (Hoffmannsegg, 1804)
Cupido argiades (Pallas, 1771)
Cupido decolorata (Staudinger, 1886) South European Russia
Cupido minimus (Fuessly, 1775)
Cupido osiris (Meigen, 1829)
genus: Cyaniris
Cyaniris bellis (Freyer, [1842]) Caucasus Minor
Cyaniris semiargus (Rottemburg, 1775)
genus: Eumedonia
Eumedonia eumedon (Esper, [1780])
genus: Favonius
Favonius aquamarinus (Dubatolov & Sergeev, 1987) Ussuri
Favonius cognatus (Staudinger, 1892) Sakhalin
Favonius jezoensis (Matsumura, 1915) Sakhalin, Kuril Island
Favonius korshunovi (Dubatolov & Sergeev, 1982) Sayan Mountains
Favonius orientalis (Murray, 1875) Amur Oblast, Ussuri
Favonius saphirinus (Staudinger, 1887)
Favonius taxila (Bremer, 1861)
Favonius ultramarinus (Fixsen, 1887) Ussuri
genus: Glabroculus
Glabroculus cyane (Eversmann, 1837) South Siberia, Sayan Mountains, Altai Range
genus: Glaucopsyche
Glaucopsyche alexis (Poda, 1761)
Glaucopsyche argali (Elwes, 1899) Altai Range
Glaucopsyche lycormas (Butler, 1866) Amur Oblast, Sakhalin
Glaucopsyche lygdamus (Doubleday, 1841)
genus: Goldia
Goldia pacifica (Dubatolov & Korshunov, 1984)
genus: Japonica
Japonica adusta (Riley, 1930) Primorsky Krai
Japonica lutea (Hewitson, [1865]) Amur Oblast, Ussuri, Sakhalin
Japonica saepestriata (Hewitson, [1865])
genus: Kretania
Kretania eurypilus (Freyer, 1851) Caucasus Minor
Kretania pylaon (Fischer von Waldheim, 1832)
Kretania sephirus (Frivaldszky, 1835) South European Russia
Kretania zephyrinus (Christoph, 1884) Caucasus Major, Caucasus Minor
genus: Lampides
Lampides boeticus (Linnaeus, 1767)
genus: Leptotes
Leptotes pirithous (Linnaeus, 1767)
genus: Lycaena
Lycaena alciphron (Rottemburg, 1775)
Lycaena candens (Herrich-Schäffer, [1844]) Caucasus Minor
Lycaena dispar (Haworth, 1802)
Lycaena helle ([Denis & Schiffermüller], 1775)
Lycaena hippothoe (Linnaeus, 1761)
Lycaena phlaeas (Linnaeus, 1761)
Lycaena thersamon (Esper, [1784])
Lycaena tityrus (Poda, 1761)
Lycaena violacea (Staudinger, 1892) Altai Mountains, Sayan Mountains, Transbaikalia
Lycaena virgaureae (Linnaeus, 1758)
genus: Lysandra
Lysandra arzanovi (Stradomsky & Shchurov, 2005)
Lysandra bellargus (Rottemburg, 1775)
Lysandra coridon (Poda, 1761)
Lysandra corydonius (Herrich-Schäffer, [1852]) Caucasus Major, Caucasus Minor
Lysandra melamarina Dantchenko, 2000
genus: Neolycaena
Neolycaena davidi (Oberthur, 1881) South Siberia, Altai Range
Neolycaena falkovitchi Zhdanko & Korshunov, 1985 North Altai Range, West Sayan Mountains
Neolycaena irkuta Zhdanko,[1996] East Altai Range, East Sayan Mountains, West Transbaikalia
Neolycaena rhymnus (Eversmann, 1832)
genus: Neolysandra
Neolysandra coelestina (Eversmann, 1843) South European Russia
genus: Neozephyrus
Neozephyrus brillantinus (Staudinger, 1887) Ussuri
Neozephyrus japonicus (Murray, 1875) Amur Oblast, Ussuri
Neozephyrus smaragdinus (Bremer, 1861) Ussuri, Sakhalin
genus: Niphanda
Niphanda fusca (Bremer & Grey, 1852) Ussuri
genus: Patricius
Patricius lucifer (Staudinger, 1867) South Siberia (mountains)
genus: Phengaris
Phengaris alcon ([Denis & Schiffermüller], 1775)
Phengaris arion (Linnaeus, 1758)
Phengaris arionides (Staudinger, 1887)
Phengaris cyanecula (Eversmann, 1848) South Siberia, Sayan Mountains, Altai Range
Phengaris kurentzovi (Sibatani, Saigusa & Hirowatari, 1994) Amur Oblast, Ussuri
Phengaris nausithous (Bergstrasser, 1779)
Phengaris ogumae (Matsumura, 1910) Sakhalin
Phengaris teleius (Bergstrasser, 1779)
genus: Plebejidea
Plebejidea loewii (Zeller, 1847) Caucasus Minor
genus: Plebejus
Plebejus argus (Linnaeus, 1758)
Plebejus argyrognomon (Bergstrasser, [1779])
Plebejus idas (Linnaeus, 1761)
Plebejus maracandicus (Erschoff, 1874) Southwest Russia, South Urals, Transbaikalia, Yakutia Magadan
Plebejus polaris (Nordström, 1928) Kamchatka
Plebejus pseudaegon (Butler, 1881) Sakhalin
Plebejus sailjugemicus Zhdanko & Samodurov, 1999 Russian Far East, Kamchatka, Altai Range
Plebejus saldaitisi Churkin & Zhdanko, 2003 Mongolia
Plebejus subsolanus Eversmann, 1851 Amur Oblast, Ussuri, Altai Range, Sayan Mountains
genus: Polyommatus
Polyommatus altivagans (Forster, 1956)
Polyommatus amandus (Schneider, 1792)
Polyommatus aserbeidschanus (Forster, 1956)
Polyommatus australorossicus Lukhtanov & Dantchenko, 2017
Polyommatus boisduvalii (Herrich-Schäffer, [1843]) Caucasus
Polyommatus damocles (Herrich-Schäffer, [1844]) South Urals
Polyommatus damon ([Denis & Schiffermüller], 1775)
Polyommatus damone (Eversmann, 1841) South European Russia, Siberia, Altai range, Caucasus
Polyommatus daphnis ([Denis & Schiffermüller], 1775)
Polyommatus dorylas ([Denis & Schiffermüller], 1775)
Polyommatus elena Stradomsky & Arzanov, 1999
Polyommatus eros (Ochsenheimer, [1808])
Polyommatus erotides (Staudinger, 1892) Russian Far East, Siberia, Transbaikalia, Altai Range, Sayan Mountains
Polyommatus icadius (Grum-Grshimailo, 1890) Alai Range, Pamirs
Polyommatus icarus (Rottemburg, 1775)
Polyommatus kamtshadalis (Sheljuzhko, 1933)
Polyommatus meoticus Zhdanko & Stshurov, 1998 Caucasus
Polyommatus pacificus Stradomsky & Tuzov, 2006
Polyommatus phyllis (Christoph, 1877) Caucasus
Polyommatus ripartii (Freyer, 1830)
Polyommatus shamil (Dantchenko, 2000) Northeast Caucasus
Polyommatus shchurovi Stradomsky, 2006 Caucasus
Polyommatus thersites (Cantener, 1835)
Polyommatus tsvetajevi (Kurentzov, 1970) Usurri
Polyommatus yurinekrutenko Kocak, 1996 Caucasus
genus: Praephilotes
Praephilotes anthracias (Christoph, 1877) Turkestan
genus: Protantigius
Protantigius superans (Oberthur, 1914)
genus: Pseudophilotes
Pseudophilotes baton (Bergstrasser, [1779])
Pseudophilotes bavius (Eversmann, 1832)
Pseudophilotes jacuticus Korshunov & Viidalерр, 1980
Pseudophilotes vicrama (Moore, 1865)
genus: Quercusia
Quercusia quercus (Linnaeus, 1758)
genus: Satyrium
Satyrium acaciae (Fabricius, 1787) South European Russia, Caucasus Major
Satyrium eximius (Fixsen, 1887) Ussuri
Satyrium herzi (Fixsen, 1887) Amur Oblast, Ussuri
Satyrium ilicis (Esper, [1779]) Central European Russia,South European Russia, Caucasus Major, Caucasus Minor
Satyrium latior (Fixsen, 1887) Amur Oblast, Ussuri
Satyrium pruni (Linnaeus, 1758)
Satyrium prunoides (Staudinger, 1887) South Siberia, Amur Oblast, Ussuri, Altai Range
Satyrium spini (Fabricius, 1787) Central European Russia,South European Russia, Caucasus Major
Satyrium w-album (Knoch, 1782)
genus: Scolitantides
Scolitantides orion (Pallas, 1771)
genus: Shijimiaeoides
Shijimiaeoides divina (Fixsen, 1887) Amur Oblast, Ussuri
genus: Shirozua
Shirozua jonasi (Janson, 1877)
genus: Tarucus
Tarucus balkanicus (Freyer, [1844]) Caucasus Minor
genus: Thecla
Thecla betulae (Linnaeus, 1758)
Thecla betulina Staudinger, 1887
genus: Tomares
Tomares callimachus (Eversmann, 1848) South European Russia, Caucasus Major, Caucasus Minor
Tomares nogelii (Herrich-Schäffer, [1851]) South European Russia
genus: Tongeia
Tongeia fischeri (Eversmann, 1843)
genus: Turanana
Turanana endymion (Freyer, [1850])
genus: Ussuriana 
Ussuriana michaelis (Oberthur, 1880)
Ussuriana stygiana (Butler, 1881) Sakhalin
genus: Wagimo 
Wagimo signata (Butler, 1881)

Nymphalidae
genus: Aglais
Aglais urticae (Linnaeus, 1758)
Aglais io (Linnaeus, 1758)
genus: Aldania
Aldania raddei (Bremer, 1861) Amur Oblast, Primorsky Krai
genus: Amuriana
Amuriana schrenckii (Menetries, 1859) Amur basin
genus: Apatura
Apatura ilia ([Denis & Schiffermüller], 1775)
Apatura iris (Linnaeus, 1758)
Apatura metis Freyer, 1829
genus: Aphantopus
Aphantopus hyperantus (Linnaeus, 1758)
genus: Araschnia
Araschnia burejana Bremer, 1861
Araschnia levana (Linnaeus, 1758)
genus: Arethusana
Arethusana arethusa ([Denis &. Schiffermüller], 1775)
genus: Argynnis
Argynnis anadyomene C. & R. Felder, 1862 Amur Oblast, Ussuri
Argynnis hyperbius (Linnaeus, 1763)
Argynnis laodice (Pallas, 1771)
Argynnis pandora ([Denis & Schiffermüller], 1775)
Argynnis paphia (Linnaeus, 1758)
Argynnis ruslana Motschulsky, 1866
Argynnis sagana Doubleday, [1847]
Argynnis zenobia Leech, 1890 Primorsky Krai
genus: Athymodes
Athymodes nycteis (Menetries, 1859) Amur Oblast, Primorsky Krai
genus: Boeberia
Boeberia parmenio (Bober, 1809) Altai Mountains South Siberia, Yakutia, Amur Oblast
genus: Boloria
Boloria alaskensis (Holland, 1900) polar regions of Russian Eurasia, mountains of North Ural, Central and East Siberia, Kamchatka, the mountains of Bureya (Amur Oblast)
Boloria altaica (Grum-Grshimailo, 1893) Tarbagatai Mountains to South Transbaikalia, East Yakutia
Boloria aquilonaris (Stichel, 1908)
Boloria banghaasi (Seitz, 1908) synonym of Euphydryas aurinia altivolans Tuzov, 2000
Boloria caucasica (Lederer, 1852) Caucasus and Transcaucasia
Boloria frigidalis Warren, 1944 Altai Mountains
Boloria napaea (Hoffmannsegg, 1804)
Boloria purpurea Churkin, 1999 Barguzin Mountains
Boloria roddi Kosterin, 2000 Altai Mountains
genus: Brenthis
Brenthis daphne (Bergstrasser, 1780)
Brenthis hecate ([Denis & Schiffermüller], 1775)
Brenthis ino (Rottemburg, 1775)
genus: Brintesia
Brintesia circe (Fabricius, 1775)
genus: Chalinga
Chalinga pratti (Leech, 1890) Ussuri
genus: Chazara
Chazara briseis (Linnaeus, 1764)
Chazara persephone (Hübner, [1805])
genus: Clossiana
Clossiana angarensis (Erschoff, 1870) Arkhangelsk Region, Magadan regions and Chukotka Sakhalin West Siberia, Novosibirsk
Clossiana butleri (Edwards, 1883) Chukotka and Kamchatka
Clossiana chariclea (Schneider, 1794) Polar regions of Russian Eurasia, Kamchatka
Clossiana dia (Linnaeus, 1767)
Clossiana distincta (Gibson, 1920) Polar Urals, Transbaikalia, Yakutia, Chukotka
Clossiana erda (Christoph, 1893) East Siberia, Zabaikalye (the Udokan and Yablonovyy mountain ranges), Amur Oblast
Clossiana eunomia (Esper, [1799])
Clossiana euphrosyne (Linnaeus, 1758)
Clossiana freija (Thunberg, 1791)
Clossiana frigga (Thunberg, 1791)
Clossiana improba (Butler, 1877) tundras and forest-tundras of Eurasia
Clossiana iphigenia (Graeser, 1888) Amur Oblast, Sakhalin, South Kuriles
Clossiana matveevi Р.Gorbunov & Korshunov, 1995 Altai Mountains
Clossiana oscarus (Eversmann, 1844) Altai Mountains, Siberia, Yakutia, Amur Oblast, Primorsky Krai
Clossiana perryi (Butler, 1882) Amur Oblast, Primorsky Krai
Clossiana polaris (Boisduval, 1828) East Siberia, Amur Oblast
Clossiana selene ([Denis & Schiffermüller], 1775)
Clossiana selenis (Eversmann, 1837)
Clossiana thore (Hübner, [1803])
Clossiana titania (Esper, [1793])
Clossiana tritonia (Bober, 1812) Amur Oblast, Primorsky Krai
genus: Coenonympha
Coenonympha amaryllis (Stoll, 1782) South Urals, Altai Mountains, Siberia, Transbaikalia, Amur, Ussuri
Coenonympha arcania (Linnaeus, 1761)
Coenonympha glycerion (Borkhausen, 1788)
Coenonympha hero (Linnaeus, 1761)
Coenonympha leander (Esper, [1784]) South Russia
Coenonympha oedippus (Fabricius, 1787)
Coenonympha pamphilus (Linnaeus, 1758)
Coenonympha symphita Lederer, 1870 Transcaucasia
Coenonympha tullia (Muller, 1764)
genus: Dilipa
Dilipa fenestra (Leech, 1891) Primorsky Krai
genus: Erebia
Erebia aethiops (Esper, [1777])
Erebia afra (Fabricius, 1787) South Russia, South Urals, Caucasus
Erebia ajanensis Menetries, 1857 Amur Oblast, Ussuri
Erebia anyuica Kurentzov, 1966 Sibera, Sayan Mountains, Yakutia
Erebia callias Edwards, 1871
Erebia cyclopius (Eversmann, 1844)
Erebia dabanensis Erschoff, 1872 Polar Urals, Sayan Mountains, Yakutia, Chukot Peninsula, Transbaikalia
Erebia disa (Thunberg, 1791)
Erebia discoidalis (Kirby, 1837) Arctic coasts of Eurasia, Polar Urals, North Siberia (tundra), Chukot Peninsula, Russian Far East, Transbaikalia, Amur
Erebia edda Menetries, 1851 Urals, Altai Mountains, South Siberia, Yakutia, Ussuri, Chukot Peninsula
Erebia embla (Thunberg, 1791)
Erebia erinnyn Warren, 1932 Sayan Mountains, Transbaikalia
Erebia euryale (Esper, [1805])
Erebia fasciata Butler, 1868 Arctic coasts of Eurasia, Siberia, Chukot Peninsula, Russian Far East
Erebia fletcheri Elwes, 1899 Altai Mountains, Yakutia, Sayan Mountains,Transbaikalia, Amur
Erebia graucasica Jachontov, 1909 Caucasus Major
Erebia iranica Grum-Grshimailo, 1895 Caucasus
Erebia jeniseiensis Trybom, 1877 Altai Mountains, Siberia, Sakhalin, Magadan
Erebia kefersteinii (Eversmann, 1851) Altai Mountains, Sayan Mountains
Erebia kindermanni Staudinger, 1881 Altai Mountains
Erebia kozhantshikovi Sheljuzhko, 1925 Transbaikalia, Chukot Peninsula
Erebia ligea (Linnaeus, 1758)
Erebia maurisius (Esper, [1803]) Altai Mountains, Sayan Mountains
Erebia medusa ([Denis & Schiffermüller], 1775)
Erebia melancholica Herrich-Schäffer, [1846] Caucasus, Transcaucasia
Erebia neriene (ВоЬег, 1809) Altai Mountains, Transbaikalia Siberia, Sayan Mountains, Amur, Ussuri
Erebia niphonica Janson, 1877 Sakhalin, Kuriles
Erebia occulta Roos &. Kimmich, 1983 Chukot Peninsula
Erebia pandrose (Borkhausen, 1788)
Erebia pawlowskii Menetries, 1859 Sayan Mountains, Yakutia, Kamchatka
Erebia polaris Staudinger, 1871
Erebia rossii (Curtis, 1834) Arctic Eurasia, Altai Mountains, Transbaikalia
Erebia sachaensis Dubatolov, 1992 Russian Far East, Yakutia, Chukot Peninsula
Erebia stubbendorfii Menetries, 1846 Altai Mountains, Sayan Mountains
Erebia theano (Tauscher, 1806) Siberia, Altai Mountains, Kuznetsk Alatau
Erebia wanga Bremer, 1864 Amur
Erebia youngi Holland, 1900 Chukot Peninsula
genus: Esperarge
Esperarge climene (Esper, [1783]) South Russia, Caucasus, Transcausia
genus: Euphydryas 
Euphydryas aurinia (Rottemburg, 1775)
Euphydryas davidi (Oberthur, 1881) Amur Oblast, Ussuri
Euphydryas ichnea (Boisduval, [1833]) South Siberia, Transbaikalia, Russian Far East, Amur Oblast, Ussuri
Euphydryas iduna (Dalman, 1816) Arctic Russia, Caucasus Major, Russian Far East, Altai Mountains, Sayan Mountains
Euphydryas maturna (Linnaeus, 1758)
Euphydryas merope (Prunner, 1798) Caucasus Major, South Siberia, Altai Mountains, Sayan Mountains
Euphydryas orientalis (Herrich-Schäffer, [1851]) Transcaucasia, South Urals
Euphydryas discordia Bolshakov & Korb, 2013  Caucasus
genus: Fabriciana
Fabriciana adippe ([Denis & Schiffermüller], 1775)
Fabriciana nerippe C. & R. Felder, 1862 Primorsky Krai
Fabriciana niobe (Linnaeus, 1758)
Fabriciana vorax Butler, 1871 Amur
Fabriciana xipe (Grum-Grshimailo, 1891) Ussuri
genus: Harima
Harima callipteris (Butler, 1877) Sakhalin, Kuriles
genus: Hipparchia
Hipparchia alcyone ([Denis & Schiffermüller], 1775)
Hipparchia autonoe (Esper, [1783]) South European Russia, North Caucasus, South Siberia, Amur Oblast
Hipparchia fagi (Scopoli, 1763)
Hipparchia pellucida (Stauder, 1924) Caucasus
Hipparchia semele (Linnaeus, 1758)
Hipparchia statilinus (Hufnagel, 1766)
Hipparchia syriaca (Staudinger, 1871)
genus: Hyponephele
Hyponephele cadusina (Staudinger, 1881) South Altai Mountains, North Alay Mountains
Hyponephele huebneri Kocak, 1980 Kasakstan
Hyponephele lupina (Costa, 1836) South European Russia, South Urals, Altai Mountains, South Siberia, Pamirs, Alay Mountains
Hyponephele lycaon (Rottemburg, 1775)
Hyponephele pasimelas (Staudinger, 1886) Baikal, Transbaikalia, Amur Oblast, Ussuri
genus: Issoria
Issoria eugenia (Eversmann, 1847) Siberia, Transbaikalia, Sayan Mountains, Alay Mountains, Russian Far East, Kamchatka
Issoria lathonia (Linnaeus, 1758)
genus: Kirinia
Kirinia epaminondas (Staudinger, 1887) Amur Oblast, Ussuri
Kirinia epimenides (Menetries, 1859) Amur Oblast, Ussuri
genus: Lasiommata
Lasiommata maera (Linnaeus, 1758)
Lasiommata megera (Linnaeus, 1767)
Lasiommata petropolitana (Fabricius, 1787)
genus: Lethe
Lethe diana (Butler, 1866)
Lethe marginalis (Motschulsky, 1860) Amur Oblast, Ussuri
genus: Libythea
Libythea celtis (Laicharting, [1782])
genus: Limenitis
Limenitis amphyssa Menetries, 1859 Siberia
Limenitis camilla (Linnaeus, 1764)
Limenitis doerriesi Staudinger, 1892 Ussuri
Limenitis helmanni Lederer, 1853 Altai Mountains, Amur Oblast, Ussuri
Limenitis homeyeri Tancre, 1881 Amur Oblast
Limenitis moltrechti Kardakoff, 1928 Amur Oblast, Ussuri
Limenitis populi (Linnaeus, 1758)
Limenitis reducta Staudinger, 1901
Limenitis sidyi Lederer, 1853 Amur Oblast, Ussuri, Transbaikalia
genus: Lopinga
Lopinga achine (Scopoli, 1763)
Lopinga deidamia (Eversmann, 1851)
genus: Maniola
Maniola jurtina (Linnaeus, 1758)
genus: Melanargia 
Melanargia epimede Staudinger, 1887 Amur
Melanargia galathea (Linnaeus, 1758)
Melanargia halimede (Menetries, 1859) Transbaikalia
Melanargia russiae (Esper, [1783])
genus: Melitaea 
Melitaea ambigua Menetries, 1859 South Siberia, Amur Oblast, Sakhalin
Melitaea arcesia Bremer, 1861
Melitaea arduinna (Esper, [1784])
Melitaea athalia (Rottemburg, 1775)
Melitaea aurelia Nickerl, 1850
Melitaea britomartis Assmann, 1847
Melitaea caucasogenita Verity, 1930 Caucasus
Melitaea centralasiae Wnukowsky, 1929
Melitaea cinxia (Linnaeus, 1758)
Melitaea diamina (Lang, 1789)
Melitaea didyma (Esper, [1778]) Mongolia
Melitaea didymina Staudinger, 1886
Melitaea didymoides Eversmann, 1847
Melitaea interrupta Kolenati, 1846 Caucasus, Transcaucasus
Melitaea latonigena Eversmann, 1847 Sayan Mountains, Altay Mountains, Yakutia
Melitaea menetriesi Caradja, 1895 Kamchatka
Melitaea persea Kollar, [1849]
Melitaea phoebe ([Denis & Schiffermüller], 1775)
Melitaea plotina Bremer, 1861 Altai Mountains, Sayan Mountains, Transbaikalia, Amur, Ussuri, Novosibirsk
Melitaea protomedia Menetries, 1858
Melitaea pseudosibina Alberti, 1969 Caucasus, Transcaucasia
Melitaea rebeli Wnukowsky, 1929 Altai Mountains
Melitaea romanovi Grum-Grshimailo, 1891 Transbaikalia
Melitaea scotosia Butler, 1878 Ussuri
Melitaea sutschana Staudinger, 1892 Transbaikalia, Amur, Ussuri,Sakhalin
Melitaea trivia ([Denis & Schiffermüller], 1775)
Melitaea westsibirica Dubatolov, 1998 Altai Mountains
genus: Neope
Neope goschkevitschii (Menetries, 1857)
Neope niphonica Butler, 1881
genus: Neptis 
Neptis alwina (Bremer & Grey, 1852) South Amur Oblast, Ussuri
Neptis andetria Fruhstorfer, 1912 Siberia
Neptis deliquata Stichel, 1908 Transbaikalia, Amur Oblast, Ussuri
Neptis ilos Fruhstorfer, 1909 Amur Oblast, Ussuri
Neptis philyra Menetries, 1859 Siberia, Amur Oblast, Ussuri
Neptis philyroides Staudinger, 1887 Amur Oblast, Ussuri
Neptis rivularis (Scopoli, 1763)
Neptis sappho (Pallas, 1771)
Neptis speyeri Staudinger, 1887 Amur Oblast, Ussuri
Neptis themis Leech, 1890 Ussuri
Neptis thisbe Menetries, 1859
genus: Ninguta 
Ninguta schrenckii (Menetries, 1859) Amur Oblast
genus: Nymphalis
Nymphalis antiopa (Linnaeus, 1758)
Nymphalis canace (Linnaeus, 1763)
Nymphalis connexa (Butler, 1881) Ussuri, Sakhalin, Kuriles
Nymphalis polychloros (Linnaeus, 1758)
Nymphalis vaualbum ([Denis & Schiffermüller], 1775)
Nymphalis xanthomelas (Esper, [1781])
genus: Oeneis
Oeneis actaeoides Lukhtanov, 1989 Yakutia, Tchukot Peninsula
Oeneis aktashi Lukhtanov, 1984 Altai Mountains, Sayan Mountains
Oeneis alpina Kurentzov, 1970
Oeneis ammon Elwes, 1899 Altai Mountains, Sayan Mountains
Oeneis ammosovi Dubatolov & Korshunov, 1988 Transbaikalia, Yakutia
Oeneis bore (Schneider, 1792) Arctic Russian Europe, Arctic Siberia, Yakutia, Magadan Oblast, Sayan Mountains
Oeneis diluta Lukhtanov, 1994 Siberia
Oeneis elwesi Staudinger, 1901
Oeneis jutta (Hübner, [1806])
Oeneis lederi Alphéraky, 1897 Siberia, Irkutsk Oblast
Oeneis magna Graeser, 1888
Oeneis melissa (Fabricius, 1775)
Oeneis nanna (Menetries, 1859) Siberia, Transbaikal, Amur Oblast, Yakutia
Oeneis norna (Thunberg, 1791)
Oeneis pansa Christoph, 1893 Yakutia, Magadan Oblast
Oeneis polixenes (Fabricius, 1775) Polar Urals, Siberia, Tchukot Region
Oeneis sculda (Eversmann, 1851) Transbaikal, Yakutia, Altai Mountains, Siberia
Oeneis tarpeia (Pallas, 1771)
Oeneis tunga Staudinger, 1894 Siberia
Oeneis urda (Eversmann, 1847)
genus: Parantica
Parantica sita (Коllаr, [1844])
genus: Pararge 
Pararge aegeria (Linnaeus, 1758)
genus: Polygonia
Polygonia c-album (Linnaeus, 1758)
Polygonia c-aureum (Linnaeus, 1758)
Polygonia egea (Cramer, [1775])
Polygonia interposita Staudinger, 1881
genus: Pseudochazara 
Pseudochazara alpina (Staudinger, 1878)
Pseudochazara daghestana (Holik, 1955)
Pseudochazara hippolyte (Esper, [1784])
Pseudochazara nukatli Bogdanov, 2000 Caucasus
Pseudochazara pallida (Staudinger, 1901)
Pseudochazara pelopea (Klug, 1832)
genus: Satyrus
Satyrus amasinus Staudinger, 1861 Transcaucasia
Satyrus dryas (Scopoli, 1763)
Satyrus ferula (Fabricius, 1793)
genus: Sephisa
Sephisa princeps (Fixsen, 1887)
genus: Speyeria
Speyeria aglaja (Linnaeus, 1758)
genus: Thaleropis
Thaleropis ionia (Eversmann, 1851) Armenia, Azerbaijan
genus: Triphysa
Triphysa nervosa Motschulsky, 1866
Triphysa phryne (Pallas, 1771)
genus: Vanessa
Vanessa atalanta (Linnaeus, 1758)
Vanessa cardui (Linnaeus, 1758)
Vanessa indica (Herbst, 1794)
genus: Ypthima
Ypthima argus Butler, 1866
Ypthima motschulskyi (Bremer & Grey, 1852) Amur Oblast
Ypthima multistriata Butler, 1883 synonym

Papilionidae
genus: Achillides 
Achillides bianor (Cramer, [1777])
Achillides maackii (Menetries, 1859)
genus: Atrophaneura
Atrophaneura alcinous (Klug, 1836)
genus: Iphiclides
Iphiclides podalirius (Linnaeus, 1758)
genus: Luehdorfia
Luehdorfia puziloi (Erschoff, 1872)
genus: Papilio
Papilio machaon Linnaeus, 1758
Papilio xuthus Linnaeus, 1767
genus: Parnassius
Parnassius amgunensis Sheljuzhko, 1928
Parnassius apollo (Linnaeus, 1758)
Parnassius arcticus (Eisner, 1968)
Parnassius ariadne (Lederer, 1853)\
Parnassius bremeri С.Felder & R.Felder, 1864
Parnassius eversmanni [Menetries, 1850]
Parnassius felderi Bremer, 1861
Parnassius hoenei Schweitzer, 1912
Parnassius mnemosyne (Linnaeus, 1758)
Parnassius nomion Fischer von Waldheim, 1823
Parnassius nordmanni [Menetries, 1850]
Parnassius phoebus (Fabricius, 1793)
Parnassius stubbendorfii Menetries, 1849
Parnassius tenedius Eversmann, 1851
genus: Sericinus
Sericinus montela Gray, 1852
genus: Zerynthia
Zerynthia caucasica (Lederer, 1864)
Zerynthia polyxena ([Denis & Schiffermüller], 1775)

Pieridae
genus: Anthocharis
Anthocharis cardamines (Linnaeus, 1758)
Anthocharis damone Boisduval, 1836
Anthocharis gruneri Herrich-Schäffer, [1851]
Anthocharis scolymus Butler, 1866
genus: Aporia
Aporia crataegi (Linnaeus, 1758)
Aporia hippia (Bremer, 1861)
genus: Baltia
Baltia shawii (Bates, 1873) Pamirs
genus: Colias
Colias alfacariensis Ribbe, 1905
Colias aurorina Herrich-Schäffer, [1850]
Colias caucasica Staudinger, 1871
Colias chippewa Edwards, 1872
Colias chrysotheme (Esper, [1781])
Colias croceus (Fourcroy, 1785)
Colias erate (Esper, [1803])
Colias fieldii Menetries, 1855
Colias hecla Lefebvre, 1836
Colias heos (Herbst, 1792)
Colias hyale (Linnaeus, 1758)
Colias hyperborea Grum-Grshimailo, 1899
Colias myrmidone (Esper,[1777])
Colias nastes Boisduval, 1832
Colias palaeno (Linnaeus, 1761)
Colias tamerlana Staudinger, 1897
Colias thisoa Menetries, 1832
Colias tyche (Bober, 1812)
genus: Euchloe
Euchloe ausonia (Hübner, [1804])
Euchloe creusa (Doubleday, [1847])
Euchloe ochracea (Trybom, 1877) described from Mongolian Altai (Shadzgat-Nuruu Mountains)
genus: Gonepteryx
Gonepteryx amintha (Blanchard, 1871) Ussuri
Gonepteryx aspasia Menetries, 1859
Gonepteryx maxima Butler, 1885
Gonepteryx rhamni (Linnaeus, 1758)
genus: Leptidea
Leptidea amurensis (Menetries, 1859)
Leptidea duponcheli (Staudinger, 1871) South Europran Russia, Transcaucasia, Caucasus, Crimea
Leptidea morsei (Fenton, 1881)
Leptidea reali Reissinger, 1989
Leptidea sinapis (Linnaeus, 1758)
genus: Pieris
Pieris brassicae (Linnaeus, 1758)
Pieris bryoniae (Hübner, [1805])
Pieris canidia (Sparrman, 1768)
Pieris dulcinea (Butler, 1882) Amur, Ussuri, Russian Far East, Sakhalin, Kuriles
Pieris euorientis Verity, [1908] Altai Mountains, Yakutia
Pieris melete Menetries, 1857 Amur, Ussuri
Pieris napi (Linnaeus, 1758)
Pieris pseudonapi Verity, 1911 may be synonym of Pieris dulcinea
Pieris rapae (Linnaeus, 1758)
Pieris tomariana Matsumura, 1928 Kuriles
genus: Pontia 
Pontia callidice (Hübner, [1800])
Pontia chloridice (Hübner, [1813])
Pontia daplidice (Linnaeus, 1758)
Pontia edusa (Fabricius, 1777)
genus: Zegris
Zegris eupheme (Esper, [1805])
Zegris pyrothoe (Eversmann, 1832) Southwest Siberia

Riodinidae
genus: Hamearis 
Hamearis lucina (Linnaeus, 1758)

See also
 List of moths of Russia
 List of the butterflies of Saint Petersburg and Leningrad Oblast
 List of ecoregions in Russia

References
  (Ed.) 2008: Catalogue of the Lepidoptera of Russia. St. Petersburg-Moscow: KMK Press, 425 p.
Tuzov, V. K., Bogdanov, P. V., Devyatkin, A. L., Kaabak, L. V., Korolev, V. A., Murzin, V. S., Samodurov, G. D. & Tarasov, E. A. 1997 Guide to the Butterflies of Russia and Adjacent Territories (Lepidoptera, Rhopalocera). Sofia: Pensoft.
Korb, S.K. & Bolshakov, L.V., 2011: A catalogue of butterflies (Lepidoptera: Papilionoformes) of the former USSR. Second edition, reformatted and updated. Eversmannia, Supplement 2.
Y. Korshunov, P. Gorbunov. Dnevnye babochki aziatskoi chasti Rossii. Spravochnik. [Butterflies of the Asian part of Russia. A handbook]. Ural University Press, Ekaterinburg - 1995 - 202 p. [in Russian]  online in English
Bozano,G.C. Guide to the Butterflies of the Palearctic Region . Milan: Omnes Artes.incomplete (parts in progress) some parts available as e-books.

Further reading
Seitz, A., 1912a-1927. Die Palaearktischen Tagfalter. Grossschmetterlinge Erde 1: 8-379 online in English
 Papers by Stanislav Konstantinovich Korb, Alexander Borisovich Zhdanko, Ludwig Carl Friedrich Graeser, Édouard Ménétries, Sergei Nikolaevich Alphéraky, Victor Ivanovitsch Motschulsky, Otto Vasilievich Bremer, Grigorii Efimovitsch Grum-Grshimailo, Nikolai Jakovlevice Kusnezov, Yuri Korshunov

External links
Butterflies of the Caucasus region and south of Russia
Y.P. Korshunov and P.Y. Gorbunov 1995: Butterflies of the Asian part of Russia
The Siberian Zoological Museum Lepidoptera collection Institute of Systematics and Ecology of Animals Specimen photos
Russian Insects
Euroleps Butterflies of the Palearctic
Insecta.pro >Catalogue> Russia> 1000 per page
Seitz, A. Die Gross-Schmetterlinge der Erde 13: Die Palaearktischen Tagfalter. Plates
Seitz, A. Die Gross-Schmetterlinge der Erde 13: Die Palaearktischen Tagfalter. Text (as search available pdf pdf)
fauna-eu[.org ] Fauna Europaea Excludes Russian Far East. Includes 1.North European Russia: Murmanskaya Oblast,  Kareliya Respublika, Arkhangel'skaya Oblast, inland incl. Nenetskiy Avtonomnyy Okrug, excluding Nova Zemlya and Franz Josef Land which are treated separately), Komi Respublika, Vologodskaya Oblast 2.Northwest European Russia:  Leningradskaya Oblast, Pskovskaya Oblast, Novgorodskaya Oblast 3.Central European Russia: Kostromskaya Oblast, Tverskaya Oblast, Yarovslavskaya Oblast, Ivanovskaya Oblast, Nizhegorodskaya Oblast, Vladimirskaya Oblast, Smolenskaya Oblast, Moskovskaya Oblast, Ryazanskaya Oblast, Mordoviya Respublika, Chuvashkaya Respublika,  Ul'yanovskaya Oblast, Kaluzhskaya Oblast, Tul'skaya Oblast, Lipetskaya Oblast, Tambovskaya Oblast,  Penzenskaya Oblast, Bryanskaya Oblast, Orlovskaya Oblast, Kurskaya Oblast, Voronezhskaya Oblast, Belgorodskaya Oblast 4.East European Russia:Kirovskaya Oblast, Permskaya Oblast (incl. Komi-Permyatskiy Avtonomnyy Okrug), Udmurtskaya Respublika, Bashkortostan Respublika, Mariy El Respublika, Tatarstan Respublika, Samarskaya Oblast, Orenburgskaya Oblast 5.South European Russia:Saratovskaya Oblast, Volgogradskaya Oblast, Astrakhanskaya Oblast, Rostovskaya Oblast, Kalmykiya Respublika 6.Kaliningradskaya Oblast (between Poland and Lithuania) 7.Novaya Zemlya 8.Franz Josef Land (excl. Ushakova I. and Vize I.)

Russia
Russia
Butterflies
Butterflies